EFSI may refer to:

 the ICAO code of Seinäjoki Airport in Finland,
 the European Fund for Strategic Investments, of the European Investment Bank